Danai Tsatsou (born 12 July 1980) is a Greek equestrian. She competed in two events at the 2004 Summer Olympics.

References

1980 births
Living people
Greek female equestrians
Olympic equestrians of Greece
Equestrians at the 2004 Summer Olympics
Sportspeople from Athens